The 2016 Rally Mexico (formally the 13º Rally Guanajuato México) was the third round of the 2016 World Rally Championship. The race was held over four days between 3 March and 6 March 2016, and was based in León, Guanajuato, Mexico. Volkswagen's Jari-Matti Latvala won the race, his 16th win in the World Rally Championship.

Entry list

Overall standings

Special stages

Power Stage
The "Power stage" was a  stage at the end of the rally.

References

Mexico
Rally Mexico
Rally